Mayken Coecke or Maria Coecke (1545–1578) was the daughter of Pieter Coecke van Aelst and Mayken Verhulst. Mayken married Pieter Bruegel the Elder in 1563. Bruegel was apprenticed to Pieter Coecke van Aelst, a leading Antwerp artist who had relocated to Brussels.

They had three children: Pieter Brueghel the Younger (born 1564/65), Maria (born 1566) and Jan Brueghel the Elder (born 1568). Their sons later became known as "Helse Brueghel" and "Fluwelen Brueghel".

Mayken Coecke was mentioned as a painter herself in a 17th-century manuscript from Mechelen.

Mayken died in 1578. She was buried next to her husband in the Chapel Church; their son Jan Brueghel the Elder provided the church with a commemorative plaque honouring his parents.

Notes

Pieter Bruegel the Elder
Dutch women painters
People from Brussels
1540s births
1578 deaths